Auchenskeoch Tower is a 17th-century tower house situated in Dumfries and Galloway, south-west Scotland. It is near Dalbeattie in the civil parish of Colvend and Southwick, in the county of Kirkcudbrightshire. It is thought to be built on a Z-plan, making it the only such tower in Galloway.  Dalswinton Tower in the neighbouring county of  Dumfriesshire is the only other example in Dumfries and Galloway. The remains of the tower are within the modern Castle Farm and are a scheduled ancient monument.

References

 Coventry, Martin (2001) The Castles of Scotland, 3rd Ed. Scotland: Goblinshead  
Maxwell-Irving, A. M. T. (2000) The Border Towers of Scotland, Creedon Publications 

Castles in Dumfries and Galloway
Scheduled Ancient Monuments in Dumfries and Galloway